Yao Lingwei (born 5 December 1995 in Xuzhou) is a female Chinese football player, who is a member of the China squad for 2022 AFC Women's Asian Cup.

Yao studied at Jiangsu University School of Teacher's Education.

See also
Football in China

References

Chinese women's footballers
Living people
1995 births
Place of birth missing (living people)
Women's association footballers not categorized by position